The Ice Twins is a 2015 psychological thriller, written by S. K. Tremayne (a pen name of British author and journalist Sean Thomas). Screenwriter Isaac Adamson has adapted the novel for a film.

Plot 
The novel describes the troubled lives of Sarah and Angus Moorcroft who lose one of their young twin daughters in an accident. A year after the tragedy, Angus and Sarah decide to take their surviving twin, Kirstie, to live on a small island off Skye, in Scotland. Just before the family's move to Scotland, Kirstie claims she is, in fact, her identical twin sister Lydia, supposedly dead.

Reception 
The novel was an international bestseller, reaching number 1 on the Sunday Times list, in the UK; it spent several months on bestseller lists in Germany, the Netherlands, Finland, Denmark, South Korea, Brazil, and elsewhere.

References

2015 British novels
British thriller novels
Psychological thriller novels
HarperCollins books
Twins in fiction
Novels set on islands
Novels set in Highland (council area)